Ali Pancha Mage Mithura is a 2008 Sri Lankan Sinhala thriller film directed by Luvis Vanderstraaten and produced by Judy Muthaiyya for SPM Films. It stars Wasantha Kumaravila and Anusha Damayanthi in lead roles along with Wilson Karunaratne and Ronnie Leitch. Music composed by Asokaa Peiris.

Plot

Cast
 Wasantha Kumaravila
 Anusha Damayanthi
 Wilson Karunaratne
 Ronnie Leitch
 Martin Gunadasa
 Sarath Dikkumbura
 Vinoja Nilanthi

References

2008 films
2000s Sinhala-language films